Horace Edward King (born March 5, 1953) is a former American football running back. He played college football at the University of Georgia from 1972 to 1974 and professional football in the National Football League for the Detroit Lions from 1975 to 1983.

A native of Athens, Georgia, he played high school football at Clarke Central High School in that city.  He next played at the University of Georgia from 1972 to 1974, totaling 1,673 yards from scrimmage. On October 12, 1974, he gained 134 yards and tied a Georgia record with four touchdowns against Ole Miss.

King was selected by the Detroit Lions in the sixth round of the 1975 NFL Draft and played nine years for the Lions from 1975 to 1983. He was the Lions' leading rusher in 1977 when he totaled 521 rushing yards.  His best season was 1978 when he started 15 games at fullback and totaled 1,056 yards from scrimmage (660 rushing and 396 receiving) and scored six touchdowns. In his nine-year NFL career, King totaled 2,081 rushing yards and 3,660 yards from scrimmage. He was cut by the Lions in late August 1984.

References

1953 births
Living people
Sportspeople from Athens, Georgia
American football running backs
Georgia Bulldogs football players
Players of American football from Georgia (U.S. state)
Detroit Lions players